John William Carlin (born August 3, 1940) is an American educator and politician who served as the 40th governor of Kansas from 1979 to 1987, and the archivist of the United States from May 30, 1995, to February 15, 2005. He teaches at Kansas State University as a visiting professor and previously operated a website to advance civic engagement. Carlin is also a member of the ReFormers Caucus of Issue One.

Early life
Carlin was born in Salina, Kansas. He was raised in the Saline County, Kansas community of Smolan. Carlin attended Kansas State University and earned a degree in dairy science in 1962. He was a member of FarmHouse fraternity.

Career

A dairy farmer, Carlin ran for a seat in the Kansas House of Representatives in 1970. He served as Speaker of the Kansas House from 1977 to 1979. In 1979 he became the youngest 20th century governor of Kansas, defeating incumbent Robert Frederick Bennett. In 1990, he lost the Democratic nomination for governor to then-State Treasurer Joan Finney. He also ran unsuccessfully for the U.S. House of Representatives in 1994, when he was defeated by Sam Brownback, whom Carlin had appointed Secretary of Agriculture of Kansas in 1986.

Carlin chaired the National Governors Association from 1984 to 1985 and the Midwestern Governors Conference.

Appointed by President Bill Clinton, Carlin served as the Archivist of the United States from 1995 to 2005, in Washington, D.C. After a dispute about Executive Order 13233, Carlin's term as archivist was not renewed by the Bush Administration. He served as chair of the National Historical Publications and Records Commission while serving as archivist.

After his retirement, Carlin returned to Manhattan, Kansas, where he serves as a visiting professor, executive-in-residence, in the political science department at Kansas State University and in the university's School of Leadership Studies. He has visited Duke University, the University of Kansas, Wichita State University, and Washburn University as visiting professor.

Carlin served as a member of the Kansas Bioscience Authority from July 2006 to August 2012.

In January 2015, Carlin launched a website to explore ideas, stimulate creative thinking, and advance civic engagement. Along with an active social media presence, the site shares his experience and perspective through a blog on current issues, compelling photo and biographical content, and a series of short video clips that can be used as a resource in classrooms, organizations, and for personal learning on the topic of leadership.

Carlin is also a member of the ReFormers Caucus of Issue One.

See also
 Executive Order 13233

References

External links
 
 
 National Archives
 National Governors Association
Publications concerning Kansas Governor Carlin's administration available via the KGI Online Library

|-

|-

|-

|-

|-

1940 births
American archivists
American Lutherans
Democratic Party governors of Kansas
Farmers from Kansas
Kansas State University alumni
Living people
Democratic Party members of the Kansas House of Representatives
Politicians from Salina, Kansas
Politicians from Manhattan, Kansas
Kansas State University faculty
George W. Bush administration personnel
Clinton administration personnel